The Belarus women's national field hockey team represents Belarus in women's international field hockey.

The team mainly plays in the Women's EuroHockey Championship II, but qualified for the 2019 Women's EuroHockey Nations Championship, by ending first in the 2017 Women's EuroHockey Championship II.

In response to the 2022 Russian invasion of Ukraine, the FIH banned Belarusian officials from FIH events.

Tournament history

EuroHockey Championship
2013 – 8th place
2019 – 8th place

EuroHockey Championship II
2005 – 5th place
2007 – 4th place
2009 – 5th place
2011 – 
2015 – 
2017 – 
2021 –

Hockey World League
2012–13 – 19th place
2014–15 – 23rd place
2016–17 – 21st place

FIH Hockey Series
2018–19 – Second round

See also
Belarus men's national field hockey team

References

External links
Official website
FIH profile

European women's national field hockey teams
field hockey
National team